Fort Niobrara was a military installation in the U.S. state of Nebraska.

Fort Niobrara may also refer to
Fort Niobrara National Wildlife Refuge in Nebraska
Fort Niobrara Wilderness, within the wildlife refuge